Stygobromus gradyi, commonly called Grady's cave amphipod, is a troglomorphic species of amphipod in family Crangonyctidae. It is endemic to California in the United States.

References

Freshwater crustaceans of North America
Crustaceans described in 1974
gradyi
Cave crustaceans
Endemic fauna of California